The 2022 Penn Quakers football team represented the University of Pennsylvania  as a member of the Ivy League during the 2022 NCAA Division I FCS football season. The team was led by seventh-year head coach Ray Priore and played its home games at Franklin Field.

Previous season

The Quakers finished the 2021 season with a record of 3–7, 1–6 Ivy League play to finish in a 3 way tie for last place.

Schedule

Game summaries

Colgate

Lafayette

at Dartmouth

at Georgetown

Columbia

Yale

at Brown

at Cornell

Harvard

at Princeton

References

Penn
Penn Quakers football seasons
Penn Quakers football